The third season of the Kannada-language version of Indian reality television series Bigg Boss started on 25 October 2015 and ended on 31 January 2016 on Colors Kannada. Sudeep, the host of previous seasons remains as the host.

Among five finalists Shruthi emerged as the title winner with maximum votes and performance in house followed by Chandan Kumar as runner-up, Master Anand, Rehman Haseeb and Pooja Gandhi as third, fourth and fifth respectively

Production 
Sudeep has signed a INR 18 crore deal with the channel Colors Kannada to host the next five seasons. The Bigg Boss house located in Lonavala is believed to be omitted for this season, replacing it with the venue to be built in Innovative Film City at Bidadi, Bengaluru. Gurudas Shenoy and Subramania.M were the reality episode directors. Chinmay Subraya Bhat was the reality writer of this season.

Housemates
Bhavana Belegere is a TV host and the daughter of journalist Ravi Belagere. She is married to actor Srinagar Kitty.
Chandan Kumar appeared in the television serials Lakshmi Baaramma and Radha Kalyana. He has also acted in films like Parinaya, Katte, Eradondla Mooru and recently in Luv U Alia.
Huccha Venkat is an actor, director and producer. He was the first contestant to be ejected out of the house in the history of Bigg Boss Kannada for assaulting a housemate.
Jayashree Ramaiah is a model and dancer by profession.
Kruthika Ravindra is a Kannada film and serial artist. She made her debut on silver screen with the Kannada film ‘Patre Loves Padma’ which was a box-office failure, in spite of having hit songs because of its bad plot and acting. She came into prominence with the lead role in daily soap opera ‘Radha Kalyana’ which aired on Zee Kannada.
Madhuri Itagi played lead actress in the movies Rambo and Ouija
Master Anand  is extremely talented and started his acting career as a child artiste and now a popular face on television. He has directed numerous Kannada movies and TV serials. He is also the winner of "Dancing Star 2".
Neravanda Aiyappa is a cricketer who played for Karnataka team in Ranji and other domestic tournaments. He is also the younger brother of Kannada actress Prema.
Neha Gowda is an air hostess.
Pooja Gandhi is an actress, movie producer & politician who has acted in over 50 films in multiple languages, including Mungaaru Male. She was evicted from the show but kept in a secret room and returned later..
Pradeep alias Tsunami Kitty was the winner of reality show "Indian". He also won the first season of "Thaka Dhimi Tha Dancing Star". He is a vegetable vendor by profession and is based out of Heggada Devana Kote, it's one of the taluk of Mysore district.
Ravi Mooruru is a singer and music composer, who has mainly worked for television serials. He has performed numerous of live concerts with singers like Puttur Narasimha Nayak, Pravin Godkhindi, Sangeetha Katti, Fayaz Khan, and C. Ashwath.
Rehman Haseeb/Hassan is a popular TV news presenter from TV 9. He is from Hassan District. He is a TV news presenter for the last 10 years. He currently resides in Bangalore. He is married to his co-worker Sameena .
RJ Nethra is a two time national award-winning radio jockey working for 91.1 FM. She has also acted in movies like "Aatagara" and "Ring Road".
Shruti is an actress and politician. She has not only acted in Kannada but also in Tamil and Malayalam. She is serving as the chief Secretary in BJP women's wing of Karnataka. She won the Bigg Boss 3 thereby fulfilling her daughter's dream.

Wild card contestants

Mithra is a famous Kannada comedian.(Janesha in "Silli Lalli")
Gowthami Gowda is a Kannada TV actress. She was acted in the name of serial chi sow savithri telecasted on Zee TV Kannada.
Sushma Veer is a theatre and dance artist. Also Sushma Veer, is the daughter of singer and veteran actress B Jayashree.

Weekly summary

Nominations table

Notes

: Kruthika direct nomination by House Captain.
: Huccha ejected because he manhandled Ravi.

References

External links
Official website 
IMDb

Bigg Boss Kannada
2015 Indian television seasons
2016 Indian television seasons
Colors Kannada original programming
Kannada-language television shows